This is a list of members of the government of the United Kingdom in office under the leadership of Lord Liverpool from 1812 to 1827. He was appointed Prime Minister of the United Kingdom by the Prince Regent after the assassination of Spencer Perceval.

Cabinet

1812–1827
Lord Liverpool – First Lord of the Treasury and Leader of the House of Lords
Lord Eldon – Lord Chancellor
Lord Harrowby – Lord President of the Council
Lord Westmorland – Lord Privy Seal
Lord Sidmouth – Secretary of State for the Home Department
Lord Castlereagh (Lord Londonderry after 1821) – Secretary of State for Foreign Affairs and Leader of the House of Commons
Lord Bathurst – Secretary of State for War and the Colonies
Lord Melville – First Lord of the Admiralty
Nicholas Vansittart – Chancellor of the Exchequer
Lord Mulgrave – Master-General of the Ordnance
Lord Buckinghamshire – President of the Board of Control
Charles Bathurst – Chancellor of the Duchy of Lancaster
Lord Camden – minister without portfolio

Changes
Late 1812 – Lord Camden leaves the Cabinet
September 1814 – William Wellesley-Pole (Lord Maryborough from 1821), the Master of the Mint, enters the Cabinet
February 1816 – George Canning succeeds Lord Buckinghamshire at the Board of Control
January 1818 – Frederick John Robinson, the President of the Board of Trade, enters the Cabinet
January 1819 – The Duke of Wellington succeeds Lord Mulgrave as Master-General of the Ordnance. Lord Mulgrave becomes minister without portfolio
1820 – Lord Mulgrave leaves the cabinet
January 1821 – Charles Bathurst succeeds Canning as President of the Board of Control, remaining also at the Duchy of Lancaster
January 1822 – Robert Peel succeeds Lord Sidmouth as Home Secretary
February 1822 – Charles Williams-Wynn succeeds Charles Bathurst at the Board of Control. Bathurst remains at the Duchy of Lancaster and in the Cabinet
September 1822 – Following the suicide of Lord Londonderry, George Canning becomes Foreign Secretary and Leader of the House of Commons
January 1823 – Vansittart, elevated to the peerage as Lord Bexley, succeeds Charles Bathurst as Chancellor of the Duchy of Lancaster. F.J. Robinson succeeds Vansittart as Chancellor of the Exchequer. He is succeeded at the Board of Trade by William Huskisson
1823 – Lord Maryborough, the Master of the Mint, leaves the Cabinet. His successor in the office is not a Cabinet member

Full list of ministers

Members of the Cabinet are in bold face.

Notes

References
 Chris Cook and John Stevenson, British Historical Facts 1760–1830
 Joseph Haydn and Horace Ockerby, The Book of Dignities

British ministries
1812 establishments in the United Kingdom
1827 disestablishments in the United Kingdom
1810s in the United Kingdom
1820s in the United Kingdom
Ministries of George III of the United Kingdom
Ministries of George IV of the United Kingdom
Cabinets established in 1812
Cabinets disestablished in 1827